June bug or Junebug may refer to:

Beetles
 Phyllophaga, a genus of beetles in the subfamily Melolonthinae of the family Scarabaeidae, also known as June bugs or June beetles
 Green June beetle (Cotinis nitida), of the southeastern United States
 Ten-lined June beetle (Polyphylla decemlineata), of the western United States and Canada
 Figeater beetle (Cotinis mutabilis), of the western and southwestern United States
 European chafer (Rhizotrogus majalis/Amphimallon majalis), a beetle native to continental Europe, but now also in North America

Entertainment

Songs
"Junebug", by The B-52's
"Junebug", from the album Good Morning Spider by Sparklehorse
"Junebug", by Robert Francis
"June Bug", from the album Stoner Witch by Melvins
"Junebug", by Stan Van Samang
"Junebug", by Kate Ryan

Fictional characters
June Bug, wife of Bucky Bug, a Disney animated character 
Junebug, a Funky Winkerbean comic strip character
Junebug (My Little Pony), an Earth pony
Junebug, a character in Kentucky Route Zero

Films
Junebug (film), a 2005 film

People
A nickname for Dale Earnhardt Jr., professional race car driver
DJ Junebug (1958-1983), real name Jose Olmeda Jr., a pioneering DJ and the subject of the 2010 documentary White Lines and the Fever: The Death of DJ Junebug

Other uses
 AEA June Bug, an early aircraft designed by Glenn Curtiss and built in 1908
 June bug (cocktail), an alcoholic beverage
 "June Bug", a pre-production codename for the Commodore Amiga 600 home computer, named after the B52's song, and released in March 1992

Animal common name disambiguation pages